Cirolanides is a genus of isopods in the family Cirolanidae. There is at least one described species in Cirolanides, C. texensis.

References

Cymothoida
Articles created by Qbugbot